Artaxias IV or Artashir IV who is also known as Artaxias, Artashes, Artashes IV, Artashir, Ardases, Ardasir and Artases (flourished 5th century) was a prince who served as a Sassanid client king of eastern Armenia from 422 until 428. Artaxias IV was the last Arsacid  king of Armenia and the last person to hold the crown of the ancient Armenian Kingdom.

Family background, early life and rise to the throne
Artaxias IV was the son of Vramshapuh who ruled eastern Armenia as a Sassanid vassal from 389 until 417.  Artaxias' uncle, Khosrov IV, ruled Armenia before Vramshapuh (and possibly after as well). Modern genealogies depict Artaxias IV as the grandson of Varasdates (Varazdat). Artaxias IV was born about 405, as he was seventeen years old when enthroned. The identity of his mother is unknown. She may have been Vramshapuh's wife or concubine. Artaxias IV was born and raised in Armenia and little is known about his life, prior to his kingship. Artaxias IV was named in honor of past kings of Armenia and Iberia who had this name.

When Vramshapuh died in 417, Artaxias IV was too young to succeed his father as king. After his father died, the Armenian Catholicos Sahak, who was Artaxias IV’s distant relative, visited the court of the Sassanid king, Yazdegerd I, to obtain the release of Khosrov IV from political exile. Yazdegerd consented and released Khosrov from imprisonment. Upon release, Khosrov may have served again as king of Armenia from 417 until 418, when he died. Little is known about Artaxias IV’s relationship with his father and uncle.

Until 422, Armenia was under direct rule of the local Armenian nakharar nobility and the Sassanid dynasty. The nakharar requested that the Sassanid dynasty enthrone a client king from the Arsacid line. In 422, Artaxias IV was enthroned as king of Armenia.

Kingship
Upon his elevation to the throne, Artaxias IV called himself Artashir in deference to past Sassanid kings. Following his uncle and father, Artaxias IV served as the third Sassanid vassal of eastern Armenia, ruling as a Christian monarch subservient to a Zoroastrian state.

As king, Artaxias IV had the support of the reigning Catholicos, Sahak. Although Artaxias IV was recognised by the nakharars as their king, the centrifugal tendencies of the nobles were beyond his control. The leading members of the nobility soon resumed their intrigues under pretense of disgust at the young king’s vices. Due to his youth and weakness in character, Artaxias IV was unable to cope with the Armenian aristocracy. Sahak appealed at various times to the nakharars to respect the king's supreme authority, to cooperate with him and be his ally, but these appeals were disregarded.

The nakharars lost confidence in the Armenian monarchy and determined that direct rule by Persia would be preferred over vassalage. At the nakharars' request, Artaxias IV was dethroned by Bahram V in 428. Armenia was annexed and became a satrapy of the Persian Empire. The Sassanids installed Veh Mihr Shapur as marzban of Persian Armenia. The further fate of Artaxias IV is unknown. Through the dethronement of Artaxias IV, Armenian rule by the Arsacid dynasty and almost a thousand years of Armenian monarchy ended.

References

Sources
 Faustus of Byzantium, History of the Armenians, 5th century
 Ghazar Parpetsi, History of Armenia, 5th to 6th century
 C. Toumanoff, Manual genealogy and chronology for the Christian Caucasus (Armenia, Georgia, Albania), ED. Aquila, Rome, 1976
 E. Yarshater, The Cambridge History of Iran, Cambridge University Press, 1983 
 N. Ouzounian, The Heritage of Armenian Literature: From the Oral Tradition to the Golden Age, Wayne State University Press, 2000
 R.G. Hovannisian, The Armenian People From Ancient to Modern Times, Volume I: The Dynastic Periods: From Antiquity to the Fourteenth Century, Palgrave Macmillan, 2004
 V.M. Kurkjian, A History of Armenia, Indo-European Publishing, 2008
 R.P. Adalian, Historical Dictionary of Armenia, Scarecrow Press, 2010

5th-century kings of Armenia
Vassal rulers of the Sasanian Empire
Arsacid kings of Armenia